Alexander Sigismund von der Pfalz-Neuburg (1663–1737) was the Prince-Bishop of Augsburg from 1690 to 1737.

Biography

A member of the House of Wittelsbach, Alexander Sigismund von der Pfalz-Neuburg was born in Neuburg an der Donau on 16 April 1663, the fifth son of Philip William, Elector Palatine and his wife Landgravine Elisabeth Amalie of Hesse-Darmstadt. (At the time Alexander Sigismund was born, his father was Herzog of Palatinate-Neuburg; his father became Elector Palatine in 1685.) He was destined for the clergy from a young age, and was sent to study with the Jesuits in Neuburg an der Donau and Düsseldorf.

He was appointed coadjutor bishop of Augsburg on 10 February 1681. He suffered a serious riding accident in 1688. He was ordained as a priest on 26 July 1689.

Johann Christoph von Freyberg-Allmendingen died on 1 April 1690 and Alexander Sigismund succeeded him as Prince-Bishop of Augsburg, with Pope Alexander VIII confirming his appointment on 31 May 1690. He was consecrated as a bishop by Marquard Rudolf von Rodt, Bishop of Constance, on 18 June 1690.

In 1714, Alexander Sigismund suffered a bout of mental illness, and the cathedral chapter of Augsburg Cathedral selected Johann Franz Schenk von Stauffenberg, Bishop of Constance, to be coadjutor bishop on 11 June 1714. Alexander Sigismund finally recovered enough to resume his duties as Prince-Bishop in 1718.

He died in Augsburg on 24 January 1737.

Ancestry

References

1663 births
1737 deaths
Roman Catholic bishops of Augsburg
People from Neuburg an der Donau
History of Augsburg
Sons of monarchs